Mramor can mean:
 Mramor (Kakanj), a village in the municipality of Kakanj, Bosnia and Herzegovina
 Mramor (Sofia), a village near Sofia, Bulgaria
 Mramor (mountain), a mountain in Kosovo
 Mramor (Niš), a village in Serbia
 Mramor, Tuzla, a village in the municipality of Tuzla, Bosnia and Herzegovina